Darwinia oldfieldii is a species of flowering plant in the family Myrtaceae and is endemic to Western Australia. It is an erect, spreading shrub with oblong leaves and dense heads of erect, red flowers.

Description
The flowers are red and arranged in dense, hemispherical clusters of 10 to 12 or more, surrounded by overlapping, scaly bracts that are shorter than the flowers. Flowering occurs from August to November.

Taxonomy
First formally described in 1865 by George Bentham, the description was published in the Journal of the Linnean Society, Botany in 1867 from a specimen collected by Augustus Oldfield near the Murchison River. The specific epithet (oldfieldii) honours the collector of the type specimens.

Distribution and habitat
Darwinia oldfieldii grows in sandy soil on sandplains and on rocky ocean ledges in the Geraldton Sandplains bioregion of western Western Australia, including in Kalbarri National Park.

Conservation status
This darwinia is listed as "not threatened" by the Western Australian Government Department of Biodiversity, Conservation and Attractions.

References

oldfieldii
Endemic flora of Western Australia
Myrtales of Australia
Rosids of Western Australia
Plants described in 1865
Taxa named by George Bentham